Breaka Shaka (爱, 频率) is the first Chinese-language EP and  by South Korean singer Kangta. It was released in 2010. It was digitally released on September 13 and physically on September 14, 2010. It marks the first released by Kangta since he returned from military service.

The music video for Breaka Shaka starred his label mate, f(x)'s Victoria.

Track listing

References

2010 EPs
Kangta albums